The Italian Voice (La Voce Italiana) is an ethnic Italian-American newspaper published in  Paterson, New Jersey.  It was founded by Mary Augusto, an immigrant Italy who was the first woman to run for Mayor of Paterson, and began publication in 1932.

Augusto was born in 1901 in Nicastro, Calabria in Italy.

References

Italian-American newspapers published in the United States
Newspapers published in New Jersey
Weekly newspapers published in the United States
Paterson, New Jersey